Supay Punku (Quechua supay devil, demon, punku door, "devil door") or Supay P'unqu (Quechua p'unqu pond, dam, "devil pond" or "devil dam") is a mountain east of the Apolobamba mountain range in Bolivia, about  high. It is situated in the La Paz Department, Bautista Saavedra Province, Curva Municipality, and in the Franz Tamayo Province, Pelechuco Municipality.

References 

Mountains of La Paz Department (Bolivia)